The Papua New Guinea women's national under-19 cricket team represents Papua New Guinea in international under-19 women's cricket. The team is administrated by Cricket PNG.

The side played for the first time in the East Asia-Pacific Qualifier for the 2023 ICC Under-19 Women's T20 World Cup, in a three-match series against Indonesia. They lost the series 2–1, therefore failing to qualify for the World Cup.

References

Women's Under-19 cricket teams
C
Papua New Guinea in international cricket